Martinescu is a Romanian surname which may refer to:

Pericle Martinescu (1911–2005), writer and journalist
Nicolae Martinescu (1940–2013), heavyweight Olympic gold medalist in Greco-Roman wrestling (1972)

Romanian-language surnames
Patronymic surnames
Surnames from given names